Gajki may refer to the following places:
Gajki, Podlaskie Voivodeship (north-east Poland)
Gajki, Pomeranian Voivodeship (north Poland)
Gajki, West Pomeranian Voivodeship (north-west Poland)